Azhar Bilakhia (born 31 May 1986) is an Indian first-class cricketer who plays for Baroda.

References

External links
 

1986 births
Living people
Indian cricketers
Baroda cricketers